Corbin Montgomery Martin (born December 28, 1995) is an American professional baseball pitcher for the Arizona Diamondbacks of Major League Baseball (MLB). He previously played for the Houston Astros.

Career

Amateur
Martin attended Cypress Ranch High School in Cypress, Texas where he played baseball and football. He played college baseball at Texas A&M University. In 2016, he played collegiate summer baseball with the Falmouth Commodores of the Cape Cod Baseball League. He was selected by the Houston Astros in the second round of the 2017 MLB draft.

Houston Astros
Martin pitched in his first professional season of 2017 with the Gulf Coast Astros and Tri-City ValleyCats. In 32.2 innings pitched between both teams he was 0–1 with a 2.20 ERA. He started 2018 with the Buies Creek Astros and was promoted to the Corpus Christi Hooks during the season. In 25 games (21 starts) between the two teams, he compiled a 9–2 record with a 2.51 ERA and a 1.01 WHIP. He began 2019 with the Round Rock Express, posting a 2–1 record with a 3.13 ERA in 37 innings.

Martin was promoted to the major leagues for the first time on May 12, 2019, and made his major league debut versus the Texas Rangers. In five major league starts in 2019, Martin went 1–1 with a 5.59 ERA in 19 innings. On July 3, Martin underwent Tommy John surgery and missed the rest of the 2019 season.

Arizona Diamondbacks
Martin was traded on July 31, 2019 to the Arizona Diamondbacks (along with J. B. Bukauskas, Seth Beer, Joshua Rojas) and cash considerations in exchange for Zack Greinke. He did not play the rest of 2019 and all of 2020 as he recovered from Tommy John surgery. Martin struggled in 2021. He started off in AAA rehabbing from his Tommy John injury, and when he was eventually called up to the majors, he failed to impress. Across 5 games, Martin posted a 10.69ERA, to go with an 0-3 record. On July 8, the Diamondbacks announced that Martin, who was on AAA Reno's 7 day IL, had been shut down for the foreseeable future. He would not return to play in 2021.

On April 23, 2022, the Diamondbacks recalled Martin from Triple-A Reno.

Personal
Martin and his wife, Alyssa, were married in January 2020. Their first child, a son, was born in October 2020.

References

External links

1995 births
Living people
Baseball players from Houston
Major League Baseball pitchers
Houston Astros players
Arizona Diamondbacks players
Texas A&M Aggies baseball players
Falmouth Commodores players
Gulf Coast Astros players
Tri-City ValleyCats players
Buies Creek Astros players
Corpus Christi Hooks players
Round Rock Express players
Reno Aces players
Mat-Su Miners players